The Serie A, also called Serie A Femminile TIM due to sponsorship by TIM, is the highest league of women's football in Italy. Established in 1968, it has been run by the Italian Football Federation (FIGC) since the 2018–19 season, and currently features 10 teams.

The most successful club in the league’s history is Torres, who have won seven times. The current Serie A champions are Juventus, who won each of the last four years. As of the 2022–23 edition, the Serie A is ranked fifth in the UEFA women's coefficient, and the top two teams qualify for the UEFA Women's Champions League.

The Serie A became fully-professional from the 2022–23 season, removing the salary cap and allowing teams to pay their players a higher wage. Women's footballers became the first female athletes in Italy to be fully professional. The number of teams also decreased from 12 to 10.

History

Clubs

Champions

Wins by year 
Below is a list of previous champions, including those belonging to several independent federations under which the Serie A title was contested before entering the FIGC. Since 1968 all championships were defined as "Serie A":

Wins by club

2022–23 season 
The following ten clubs are competing in the 2022–23 season.

Top scorers

Notes

References

External links
 

 

 
women
Italy
1
Sports leagues established in 1968
1968 establishments in Italy